Southern Appalachian Repertory Theatre (SART) is a professional theatre company in residence at the historic Owen Theatre on the campus of Mars Hill University in Mars Hill, North Carolina. Founded in 1975 by director and theatre educator Jim Thomas, SART has produced scores of plays, musicals, and original works - many portraying the rich culture and heritage of Southern Appalachia. After operating for many years as a program of Mars Hill University (previously Mars Hill College), SART became an independent nonprofit organization in 2003, governed by a volunteer board of directors. In recognition of its artistic excellence and cultural importance to the community, SART has received major funding from the National Endowment for the Arts, North Carolina Arts Council, Madison County Arts Council, and the Shubert Foundation. SART also receives support from Mars Hill University, along with donations and sponsorship from patrons and local business owners.

Shortlist of past productions at SART include 
 The Fantasticks
 Of Mice and Men
 Noises Off
 Lost In Yonkers
 Blithe Spirit
 Harvey
 Working: The Musical
 A Tennessee Walk
 The Light in the Piazza
 Smoke On The Mountain: Sanders Family Christmas

Future productions include 
 Bright Star
 The Odd Couple
 The Miracle Worker
 Miracle In Bedford Falls
 The Last Five Years
 First Date
 Milestones
 A Southern Appalachian Christmas 
 A Christmas Carol

Mars Hill University
Theatre companies in North Carolina